The Minister of Economic Affairs and Climate Policy is the head of the Ministry of Economic Affairs and Climate Policy and a member of the Cabinet and the Council of Ministers. The current Minister is Micky Adriaansens of the People's Party for Freedom and Democracy (VVD) who has been in office since 10 January 2022. Regularly a State Secretary is assigned to the Ministry who is tasked with specific portfolios. The current State Secretary is Hans Vijlbrief of the Democrats 66 (D66) party who also has been in office since 10 January 2022 and has been assigned the portfolios of Mining and Extractivism. In the current cabinet there is also a Minister without Portfolio assigned to the Ministry who is also giving specific portfolios. The current Minister without Portfolio is Rob Jetten of the Democrats 66 (D66) party and who also has been in office since 10 January 2022 and has been assigned the portfolios of Climate Policy, Environment and Energy.

List of Ministers of Economic Affairs (1877–1945)

List of Ministers of Economic Affairs (since 1945)

List of Ministers without Portfolio

List of State Secretaries for Economic Affairs

See also
 Ministry of Economic Affairs and Climate Policy

References

Economic Affairs